McClure House may refer to:

Highfill-McClure House, Paragould, Arkansas, listed on the NRHP in Greene County, Arkansas
McClure House (Canon City, Colorado), listed on the National Register of Historic Places in Fremont County, Colorado
Thomas J. and Caroline McClure House, McClure, Illinois, listed on the NRHP in Alexander County, Illinois
McClure-Barbee House, Danville, Kentucky, listed on the NRHP in Boyle County, Kentucky  
McClure House (Lyndon, Kentucky), listed on the National Register of Historic Places in Jefferson County, Kentucky
McClure-Shelby House, Nicholasville, Kentucky, listed on the NRHP in Boyle County 
McClure-Hilton House, Merrimack, New Hampshire, listed on the NRHP in Hillsborough County, New Hampshire
Nickel Ensor McClure House, Alva, Oklahoma, listed on the NRHP in Woods County, Oklahoma